True Crime is a 1996 American psychological thriller film directed and written by Pat Verducci and starring Alicia Silverstone and Kevin Dillon.

Plot
Mary Giordano is a beautiful and intelligent Catholic-school senior in Burlingame, California. She is addicted to mystery novels (graphic and otherwise), film noir and detective magazines (hence the movie's title). All of this has inspired her to become a police officer, like her father who was slain in the line of duty years ago. Mary's ambition to this end amuses her siblings John and Vicky, as well as their widowed mother Celia.

Mary gets wind of a case involving the serial killer of several teenage girls, including a handful of her classmates. She launches her own investigation, which gets her in trouble with her late dad's partner, Detective Jerry Guinn. Guinn wants Mary as far away from the field as possible...ostensibly because she just doesn't have what it takes to be a cop, but also out of concern for her well-being. Undaunted, Mary enlists the aid of police cadet Tony Campbell to sniff out the murderer; gradually, the two fall in love.

Ultimately, the name "Tony Campbell" is revealed to be an alias; his real name is Daniel Henry Moffat, and he proves to be the killer both Mary and Guinn are looking for. Moffat outwits and kills Guinn, only to be outwitted by Mary and left hanging for his life. Despite Moffat’s pleads for help, a tearful Mary chooses not to save him, allowing Moffat to fall to his death. Just weeks after graduation from the 12th grade, she is seen in a police uniform - having succeeded in her aspiration of following in her father’s footsteps and joining the police department.

Cast
 Alicia Silverstone as Mary Giordano
 Kevin Dillon as Cadet Tony Campbell / Daniel Henry Moffat
 Bill Nunn as Detective Jerry Guinn
 Michael Bowen as Earl Parkins
 Marla Sokoloff as Vicki Giordano
 Ann Devaney as Sherry Tarnley
 Joshua Shaefer as John Giordano
 Jennifer Savidge as Celia Giordano
 Tara Subkoff as Liz McConnell
 David Packer as Sergeant Collins
 Alissa Dowdy as Kathleen Donlevy
 Aimee Brooks as Margie Donlevy

Production
The film was produced on location at John Marshall High School in Los Angeles, California.

Though not released until 1996, the film was actually shot a few years earlier when Alicia was under the age of 18.

Other titles for the film are Dangerous Kiss and True Detective. It was released directly to video instead of in theaters.

References

External links
 
 
 

1996 films
1996 direct-to-video films
1996 thriller films
1990s psychological thriller films
American police detective films
American psychological thriller films
Trimark Pictures films
1990s English-language films
1990s American films